Dryopteris shibpedis is a species of fern native Japan that was declared extinct in 2007, that has since been rediscovered in the Tsukuba Botanical Garden. Despite rediscovery, D. shibipedis is still ranked as extinct in the wild.

Biological origin and reproduction 

Originating from the family Dryopteridaceae, or wood ferns, the Dryopteris shibipedis is thought to be a "hybridization between a sexual tetraploid providing a diploid egg and an apogamous diploid providing a diploid sperm." This meaning, the fern itself is considered a tetraploid—having four sets of chromosomes, develops from the mother providing an egg with two sets of chromosomes and the father providing two sets of chromosomes. The two parent plants would be D. kinkiensis (mother species) and D. pacifica (father species). The embryo of the D. shibipedis has been known, however, to develop without fertilization, and can reproduce asexually, therefore ensuring stability across multiple generations.

Origin, disappearance, and rediscovery 

This particular species of fern has only been rediscovered in one small place in Japan, having been declared extinct in 2007, then was immediately rebutted due to confirmation of sightings of the fern in the botanical garden in one town in southwest Japan. This particular species is very recent in biological origin, only dating back to 1984 when a sampling of the hybridized species was given to the Tsukuba Botanical Garden by Dr. Y. Shimura, where it was later rediscovered. The species is unlikely to move out of that region for quite some time and will most likely remain small in numbers for a while due to its relative newness to its locale. While the father species with plentiful throughout Japan, the mother species only covers one region of south west Japan, therefore tightening the confines in which D. shibipedis could have been found in the first place.

Current threats 

D. shibipedis is currently on a list of 886 endangered pteridophyta taxa around the globe, of which those in the most danger of going extinct are found in Asia.

References 

 Ebihara, Atsushi et al. "Rare and Threatened Pteridophytes of Asia 1. An Enumeration of Narrowly Distributed Taxa." Bulletin of the National Museum of Natural Science B 38.3 	(2012): 93-119. Web. 23 Oct. 2012. <http://rbg-web2.rbge.org.uk/thaiferns/PDF_docs/ BNMNS2012_Rare-Pterid-Asia1.pdf>.
 Ebihara, Sadamu Matsumoto,  and Masahiro Kato. “Origin of Dryopteris shibipedis (Dryopteridaceae), a fern species extinct in the wild”. Department of Botany, 	National Museum of Nature and Science, 4-1-1 Amakubo, Tsukuba 305-0005, Japan < fulltext.html>
 Tanaka K (1999) Variation of Dryopteris pacifica in the western part of Kanagawa Prefecture. J Nippon Fern Club 3(19–20):1–7 (in Japanese)
United States of America. USDA. National Resources Conservation Service. Classification for Kingdom Plantae Down to Family Dryopteridaceae. US Department of Agriculture, n.d. Web. 23 Sept. 2012. <http://plants.usda.gov/java/ClassificationServlet? source=display&classid=Dryopteridaceae>.
 Zhang, Li-Bing, Liang Zhang, Shi-Yong Dong, Emily B. Sessa, Xin-Fen Gao, and Atsushi Ebihara. "Molecular Circumscription and Major Evolutionary Lineages of the Fern Genus Dryopteris (Dryopteridaceae)." BMC Evolutionary Biology. BMC Evolutionary Biology, 13 Sept. 2012. Web. 20 Oct. 2012. <http://www.biomedcentral.com/1471-2148/12/180/abstract>.

External links
http://www.asahi-net.or.jp/~tv9h-ark/sibiitati.htm 

shibipedis